Moriomorpha is a genus of beetles in the family Carabidae, containing the following species:

 Moriomorpha adelaidae Castelnau, 1867
 Moriomorpha victoriae Castelnau, 1867

References

Psydrinae
Taxa named by François-Louis Laporte, comte de Castelnau